Jessi's slender skink (Brachymeles kadwa) is a species of skink endemic to the Philippines.

References

Reptiles of the Philippines
Reptiles described in 2010
Brachymeles